John Kabango Rucyahana (born 14 November 1945) is a former Rwandan Anglican bishop, having been Bishop of the Anglican Diocese of Shyira.

Early life
Rucyahana lived in Rwanda until 1959 when he went into exile because of the civil war. He became a lay evangelist at the age of 21. He did his Primary Studies in three schools: Butete, Kinoni and Gitare in Bukamba District. He completed his secondary studies in Inyemeramihigo College at Gisenyi and in Goma in the Democratic Republic of Congo.

Uganda
Rucyahana started an orphanage in Uganda known as Mustard Seed Babies Home in Bunyoro. It holds the distinction of having been named the best orphanage at a national festival held in Hoima. He was on the national board of planning and development for the Church of Uganda for 9 years and was the chairman of the project committee. He started a heifer project in Bunyoro which provided not only milk but also financial support to poor families.

Rwanda
Rucyahana serves as the president of Rwanda's National Unity and Reconciliation Commission (NURC).

Rucyahana has taken a stand against the position on homosexuality of the Episcopal Church of America, who welcomed the ordination of openly non-celibate homosexual priests, as un-Biblical. Rucyahana was a leader in the Anglican Mission in the Americas, which was supported by both the Episcopal Church of Rwanda and the Episcopal Church of South East Asia. After being consecrated, Rucyahana elevated the status of the diocese both spiritually and physically. He has improved the infrastructure by building new schools and renovating old ones. Shyira hospital has been re-opened and a new cathedral has been built. Rucyahana works with various boards in Rwanda and internationally.

Call for Referendum in the Eastern DRC
In a 2008 editorial in the Rwandan newspaper The New Times, Bishop Rucyahana mentioned the eastern Democratic Republic of the Congo:
For example, the problem of Congo is uncalled for, and D.R. Congo alone has the duty to put an end to the strife. If the Congolese do not recognise the people in Eastern Congo as their fellow Congolese, the African Union should give them the option for a referendum to choose where they should belong.

Support for M23
The United Nations Group of Experts on the Democratic Republic of Congo (DRC) issued a report on 15 November 2012, which implicated Rucyahana in fundraising for the M23 rebel group, operating in the DRC. The final UN report stated:
RPF members have been recruiting sympathizers and raising funds for M23 from within Rwanda. Politicians, former Rwandan armed forces and CNDP officers told the Group that Rwigamba Balinda, a Rwandan senator and Rector of the Free University of Kigali, and John Rucyahana, a bishop (see S/2012/348/Add.1, para. 29), both RPF members, had overseen those activities in Rwanda and abroad. 
Rucyahana denied these charges in a public letter.
In 2013, a United Nations report said that Rucyahana was forced to stop fundraising for M23 because he was part of the support network of Bosco Ntaganda inside Rwanda, which was dismantled. The report said:
A former Rwandan Patriotic Front (RPF) member, two former RDF officers and a politician loyal to Ntaganda, told the Group that Bishop John Rucyahana, a Ntaganda ally in Rwanda who recruited politicians and raised funds for M23, had to stop his collaboration.

Support for Emmanuel Karenzi Karake 
On 8 July 2015, Rucyahana commented on the arrest of Emmanuel Karenzi Karake:He said the recent arrest in the United Kingdom, of Lt Gen Emmanuel Karenzi Karake, the country’s head of National Intelligence and Security Services, was a result of the contempt in which Westerners hold Rwanda.“Those people who walk and eat with killers of our people do not arrest those Genocide perpetrators, but have the guts to arrest our heroes who risked their lives to stop the Genocide. They are exercising Genocide denial.We Rwandans, knowing where we are coming from, have to jointly fight that arrogance,” he said.

Comments on Paul Kagame's Third Run for the Presidency 
On 1 January 2016, Rucyahana spoke about Paul Kagame's decision to stand for re-election as President of Rwanda:Bishop Rucyahana also added President Paul Kagame’s acceptance to stand again for presidency after his second term ends in 2017 was yet another source of joy as people celebrate the New Year.“It’s a joy for President Kagame to be able to respond to the request of the nation,” Rucyahana said.

Bibliography 
 John Rucyahana, The Bishop of Rwanda (2007)

References

Sources

External links

 United Nations Group of Experts Reports

1945 births
Living people
Rwandan Anglicans
People from Northern Province, Rwanda
21st-century Anglican bishops in Africa
Trinity School for Ministry alumni
Anglican bishops of Shyira
Anglican realignment people